Jan Bart (January 26, 1919 – August 12, 1971) was a prominent Jewish-American lyrics tenor, humorist, and raconteur. His work combined the sounds of European Jewry and American musical tastes.

Early life 

Bart was born Avram Sholom (Sol) Strauser in Sambor, Poland (now Sambir, Ukraine). His family owned a bakery, and as a very young child, he would stand on a stool and sing to the customers. By the time he immigrated with his family to the United States of America in 1930 at age 11, he had already become a cantor and continued singing at religious services at various synagogues in the Greater New York area.

Career 

At age 16 he wanted to become a contestant on the renowned Major Bowes Amateur Hour radio show, the American Idol of its day and one of the most popular programs broadcast in the United States in the 1930s and 1940s. When he could not get an appointment, he and his high school friend Sid Bernstein went to the offices, found a piano, and accompanied him to an aria from Pagliacci. Major Bowes walked in and was so taken with his voice that he completely changed the following Sunday's scheduled program to put him on. He won the contest and with it the opportunity to travel around the country with the Major Bowes’  touring group, thus supporting his family during the Depression. From there he went on to appear in nightclubs, cabarets, and theaters throughout the United States, including the Copacabana in Miami Beach, the Latin Quarter in New York, the Last Frontier in Las Vegas, and New York's famed Palace Theater.

Having been rejected from the Army for medical reasons, he contributed to the war effort by helping to sell War Bonds and singing for the troops.

Bart recorded for RCA and Columbia among others, including a rendition of "We’re in Love, We’re in Love" with the Ray Charles Chorus, and later under his own label, Janson Records. He was a member of ASCAP (The American Society of Composers, Authors And Publishers) starting with his own composition, "Ecstasy" that he penned at age 20.

Through the 1940s and ‘50s he was a regular on Yiddish radio shows, including the American-Jewish Hour, Yiddish Melodies in Swing' and The American-Jewish Caravan of Stars on WHN and WMGM radio, along with the likes of the Barry Sisters, Molly Picon and Mickey Katz, with famed composer Abe Ellstein at the baton. His "Jan Bart Show" on WEVD radio in New York ran for 18 years and his "Jan Bart Show’ on WATV-TV for six. His many television appearances included the Milton Berle Show and the National Muscular Dystrophy Telethon with Jerry Lewis. He starred in the Yiddish film "Catskill Honeymoon" in 1950.

When Israel became a state in 1948, Bart truly found his calling. He gave up his nightclub career to devote his whole life to establishing and preserving the State of Israel by working tirelessly for Israel bonds throughout the United States, Canada, Europe, and Australia. In the early days, selling Israel bonds meant riding along the boardwalk in the back of an open station wagon, pleading into a megaphone the lessons of the war, that the existence of the State of Israel was central to the survival of the Jewish people.

In the early 1950s, while appearing in Miami Beach, he was asked to sing at the very first organized Israel Bond meeting. As gifted as he was a singer, he was an even better fundraiser, melding stories with his songs. His humor portrayed the new experiences of Jewish émigrés and stories from the mamaloshen''. As Israel bond rallies developed into the organized, pre-sold events they are today, he always doubled and tripled the expected return. By his death at age 52 in 1971, he had raised more money for Israel Bonds than any other entertainer, having appeared at more than 2,200 performances over 20 years.

Throughout his life he continued to use his cantorial skills, conducting High Holiday services at the Riverside Plaza Hotel each fall and returning to the "Borscht Belt" (the Catskill Mountains of New York), where he, like many Jewish entertainers, had gotten his start, to conduct Passover services at Green's, Brown's, Young's Gap, and the Windsor  hotels.

Through the 1950s and 60s he made several recording albums, including Yinglish, old Yiddish melodies sung in English, and Fiddler on the Roof in Yiddish (see discography), for which he wrote the Yiddish lyrics. He published his biography with Barney Rubin, I Lost a Thousand Pounds (Oceanic Publications).

He was a popular entertainer at weddings and bar mitzvahs. He wrote individual anniversary songs for each occasion and sang "When did she get to be a beauty?" for every wedding and "When did he grow to be so tall?" for every bar mitzvah.

Stamp collector 
Bart was a renowned Israeli and Judaica stamp collector and authority, writing several columns and articles for stamp newspapers and journals and judging international stamp competitions. He was the founder  of the Judaica Historical Philatelic Society, which was created out of his own meticulous collection of Jews on Stamps.

Personal life 

In 1941 Bart married singer Lillian Robbins, an operatic contralto, who performed as a soloist at Radio City Music Hall. Their daughter Judy Bart Kancigor  (1943- ) is a food writer, author of "Cooking Jewish (Workman Publications). Their son Gary Bart (1946- ) is the founder of Weight Watchers of Orange County and produced the films "In the Name of the People" and "Invincible". Lillian died in 2010 at age 93.

Death 
Bart died at age 52 in 1971 from complications of diabetes. He is interred at Mt. Ararat Cemetery in Farmingdale, NY.

Jan Bart discography 

Track Title        Album/Collection Title

A Cantor s Audition 1       Jan Bart – Banner B-2008

A Baal-Agoloh Lied  Jan Bart – Best loved Jewish Songs

−
−
As der Rebbe wejnt   Jan Bart – Best loved Jewish Songs

−
−
Der Milners Trehren  Jan Bart – Best loved Jewish Songs

−
−
Der Schmeterling un di Blum     Jan Bart – Best loved Jewish Song

−
−
Ich Hob dich Tzufil Lieb   Jan Bart – Best loved Jewish Song

−
−
Jome-Jome        Jan Bart – Best loved Jewish Song

−
−
Mechutonim      Jan Bart – Best loved Jewish Song

−
−
Oif'n Pripetchik         Jan Bart – Best loved Jewish Song

−
−
Tum Balalaika  Jan Bart – Best loved Jewish Song

−
−
Tzehn Brider     Jan Bart – Best loved Jewish Song

−
−
Unter dem Kinds Wigele   Jan Bart – Best loved Jewish Song

−
−
Unzer Rebenju  Jan Bart – Best loved Jewish Song

−
−
A baal-agoloh lied     Jan Bart – Best Loved Jewish Songs – Reissue

−
−
As der rebbe wejnt    Jan Bart – Best Loved Jewish Songs – Reissue

−
−
Der milners trehren   Jan Bart – Best Loved Jewish Songs – Reissue

−
−
Der Schmeltering un di blum     Jan Bart – Best Loved Jewish Songs – Reissue

−
−
Ich hob dich tzufil lieb       Jan Bart – Best Loved Jewish Songs – Reissue

−
−
Jome-jome        Jan Bart – Best Loved Jewish Songs – Reissue

−
−
Mechutonim      Jan Bart – Best Loved Jewish Songs – Reissue

−
−
Oif'n pripitchik          Jan Bart – Best Loved Jewish Songs – Reissue

−
−
Tum-balalaika   Jan Bart – Best Loved Jewish Songs – Reissue

−
−
Tzehn brider     Jan Bart – Best Loved Jewish Songs – Reissue

−
−
Unter dem kinds wigele     Jan Bart – Best Loved Jewish Songs – Reissue

−
−
Unzer Rebenju  Jan Bart – Best Loved Jewish Songs – Reissue

−
−
Hatzlichoh No  Jan Bart – Columbia 8229-F

−
−
Zmiros      Jan Bart – Columbia 8229-F

−
−
Amcho      Jan Bart – Columbia 8230-F

−
−
Mein Teiere      Jan Bart – Columbia 8230-F

−
−
Anatevka  Jan Bart – Fiddler on the roof – Yiddish

−
−
Do you love me         Jan Bart – Fiddler on the roof – Yiddish

−
−
Far from the home I love   Jan Bart – Fiddler on the roof – Yiddish

−
−
Fiddler on the roof    Jan Bart – Fiddler on the roof – Yiddish

−
−
If I were a rich man   Jan Bart – Fiddler on the roof – Yiddish

−
−
Matchmaker      Jan Bart – Fiddler on the roof – Yiddish

−
−
Now I have Everything      Jan Bart – Fiddler on the roof – Yiddish

−
−
Sabbath prayer  Jan Bart – Fiddler on the roof – Yiddish

−
−
Sunrise Sunset  Jan Bart – Fiddler on the roof – Yiddish

−
−
To Life     Jan Bart – Fiddler on the roof – Yiddish

−
−
A Moment         Jan Bart – Janson records JR 1000 A Test Pressing

−
−
Haviva      Jan Bart – Janson records JR 1000 A Test Pressing

−
−
I Love You Much Too Much      Jan Bart – Janson records JR 1000 A Test Pressing

−
−
Misirlou   Jan Bart – Janson records JR 1000 A Test Pressing

−
−
My Mother's Sabbath Candles    Jan Bart – Janson records JR 1000 A Test Pressing

−
−
That Wonderful Girl of Mine     Jan Bart – Janson records JR 1000 A Test Pressing

−
−
And The Angels Sing        Jan Bart – Janson records JR 1000 B Test Pressing

−
−
Dancing in the Moonlight  Jan Bart – Janson records JR 1000 B Test Pressing

−
−
Deep as the night       Jan Bart – Janson records JR 1000 B Test Pressing

−
−
Momele    Jan Bart – Janson records JR 1000 B Test Pressing

−
−
Tumbalalaika    Jan Bart – Janson records JR 1000 B Test Pressing

−
−
We come to live        Jan Bart – Janson records JR 1000 B Test Pressing

−
−
01 Ale Brider    Jan bart – More Best Loved Jewish Songs

−
−
02 A Maisele    Jan bart – More Best Loved Jewish Songs

−
−
03 Shabes-Shabes      Jan bart – More Best Loved Jewish Songs

−
−
04 Rozinkes Mit Mandlen  Jan bart – More Best Loved Jewish Songs

−
−
05 Reb-Dovidel         Jan bart – More Best Loved Jewish Songs

−
−
06 A Finf un Tzvantziker   Jan bart – More Best Loved Jewish Songs

−
−
07 Israel Celebrates   Jan bart – More Best Loved Jewish Songs

−
−
08 Nor A Mame        Jan bart – More Best Loved Jewish Songs

−
−
09 Mechuteneste Maine     Jan bart – More Best Loved Jewish Songs

−
−
10 Bin Ich Mir A Schnaiderl      Jan bart – More Best Loved Jewish Songs

−
−
11 Oy Vei Rebeniu    Jan bart – More Best Loved Jewish Songs

−
−
A Finf un Tzvantziker        Jan Bart – More best loved Jewish songs – STEREO

−
−
A Maisele         Jan Bart – More best loved Jewish songs – STEREO

−
−
Ale Brider         Jan Bart – More best loved Jewish songs – STEREO

−
−
Bin Ich Mir A Schnaiderl   Jan Bart – More best loved Jewish songs – STEREO

−
−
Freg Ba Gott Kein Kashes Nit    Jan Bart – More best loved Jewish songs – STEREO

−
−
Israel Celebrates        Jan Bart – More best loved Jewish songs – STEREO

−
−
Mechuteneste Maine  Jan Bart – More best loved Jewish songs – STEREO

−
−
Nor A Mame     Jan Bart – More best loved Jewish songs – STEREO

−
−
Oy Vei Rebniu  Jan Bart – More best loved Jewish songs – STEREO

−
−
Reb-Dovidel     Jan Bart – More best loved Jewish songs – STEREO

−
−
Roszinkes mit Mandlen     Jan Bart – More best loved Jewish songs – STEREO

−
−
Shabes-Shabes  Jan Bart – More best loved Jewish songs – STEREO

−
−
Old Fashioned Sunday       Jan Bart – Premier E1-CB-2670

−
−
We're in love     Jan Bart – Premier E1-CB-2670

−
−
Mein Mazl diker Tog         Jan Bart – RCA Victor 25-5123

−
−
Tief vi Die Nacht      Jan Bart – RCA Victor 25-5123

−
−
BeArvot hanegev       Jan Bart – RCA Victor 25-5126

−
−
Minhag Chadash       Jan Bart – RCA Victor 25-5126

−
−
A gypsy serenade      Jan Bart – Sam Medoff

−
−
Czardash with me      Jan Bart – Sam Medoff

−
−
Ecstasy     Jan Bart – Seva 64

−
−
Gypsy Romance        Jan Bart – Seva 64

−
−
Mahshynka       Jan Bart – Seva 64

−
−
Ochi Chornia    Jan Bart – Seva 64

−
−
Anatevka  Jan Bart – Sings Fiddler on the Roof in Yiddish – Londisc

−
−
Do you love me         Jan Bart – Sings Fiddler on the Roof in Yiddish – Londisc

−
−
Far from the home I love   Jan Bart – Sings Fiddler on the Roof in Yiddish – Londisc

−
−
Fiddler on the roof    Jan Bart – Sings Fiddler on the Roof in Yiddish – Londisc

−
−
If I were a rich man   Jan Bart – Sings Fiddler on the Roof in Yiddish – Londisc

−
−
Matchmaker      Jan Bart – Sings Fiddler on the Roof in Yiddish – Londisc

−
−
Now I have Everythin        Jan Bart – Sings Fiddler on the Roof in Yiddish – Londisc

−
−
Sabbath prayer  Jan Bart – Sings Fiddler on the Roof in Yiddish – Londisc

−
−
Sunrise Sunset  Jan Bart – Sings Fiddler on the Roof in Yiddish – Londisc

−
−
To Life     Jan Bart – Sings Fiddler on the Roof in Yiddish – Londisc

−
−
A moment         Jan Bart – Sings Yinglish

−
−
And the angels sing   Jan Bart – Sings Yinglish

−
−
Dancing in the moonlight  Jan Bart – Sings Yinglish

−
−
Deep as the night       Jan Bart – Sings Yinglish

−
−
Haviva      Jan Bart – Sings Yinglish

−
−
I love you much too much          Jan Bart – Sings Yinglish

−
−
Misirlou   Jan Bart – Sings Yinglish

−
−
Momele    Jan Bart – Sings Yinglish

−
−
My Mother's Shabbath Candles  Jan Bart – Sings Yinglish

−
−
That wonderful girl of mine       Jan Bart – Sings Yinglish

−
−
Tumbalalaika    Jan Bart – Sings Yinglish

−
−
We come to live        Jan Bart – Sings Yinglish

−
−
Hatzlicho No    Jan Bart – Studio Tape 01 R638PRE

−
−
Ich Beink Nuch Mein Mamen    Jan Bart – Studio Tape 01 R638PRE

−
−
If I Ever Would Leave You [volt ikh dikh farlozn]      Jan Bart – Studio Tape 01 R638PRE

−
−
Laila Laila         Jan Bart – Studio Tape 01 R638PRE

−
−
Mamele    Jan Bart – Studio Tape 01 R638PRE

−
−
Mein Meidele    Jan Bart – Studio Tape 01 R638PRE

−
−
Z'Chor      Jan Bart – Studio Tape 01 R638PRE

−
−
A Maizele         Jan Bart – Studio Tape 02 R640PRE

−
−
Ale Brider         Jan Bart – Studio Tape 02 R640PRE

−
−
Be-Arvot Hanegev    Jan Bart – Studio Tape 02 R640PRE

−
−
Dem Milners Treren  Jan Bart – Studio Tape 02 R640PRE

−
−
Fiddler on the Roof   Jan Bart – Studio Tape 02 R640PRE

−
−
Havivale   Jan Bart – Studio Tape 02 R640PRE

−
−
Hora Israel        Jan Bart – Studio Tape 02 R640PRE

−
−
I Believe   Jan Bart – Studio Tape 02 R640PRE

−
−
The Kings Quartet     Jan Bart – Studio Tape 02 R640PRE

−
−
The Well [to the tune of Oyfn Pripetchik]   Jan Bart – Studio Tape 02 R640PRE

−
−
A Chazene Waltz       Jan Bart – Studio Tape 03 R641PRE

−
−
E Lucevan Le Stelle  Jan Bart – Studio Tape 03 R641PRE

−
−
Exodus     Jan Bart – Studio Tape 03 R641PRE

−
−
Finjan       Jan Bart – Studio Tape 03 R641PRE

−
−
Israeli Lullaby   Jan Bart – Studio Tape 03 R641PRE

−
−
Just One Minute        Jan Bart – Studio Tape 03 R641PRE

−
−
My Buddy         Jan Bart – Studio Tape 03 R641PRE

−
−
My Mother s Sabbath Candles   Jan Bart – Studio Tape 03 R641PRE

−
−
This Day of Days      Jan Bart – Studio Tape 03 R641PRE

−
−
You and the night      Jan Bart – Studio Tape 03 R641PRE

−
−
Blue Bird of Happiness      Jan Bart – Studio Tape 04 R642PRE

−
−
Gypsy Rhapsody       Jan Bart – Studio Tape 04 R642PRE

−
−
I Love You Much too Much       Jan Bart – Studio Tape 04 R642PRE

−
−
Matchmaker      Jan Bart – Studio Tape 04 R642PRE

−
−
Mein Taiere      Jan Bart – Studio Tape 04 R642PRE

−
−
O Jerusalem      Jan Bart – Studio Tape 04 R642PRE

−
−
Shabes Shabes  Jan Bart – Studio Tape 04 R642PRE

−
−
Shiroh       Jan Bart – Studio Tape 04 R642PRE

−
−
That Wonderful Girl of Mine     Jan Bart – Studio Tape 04 R642PRE

−
−
Z'Miros     Jan Bart – Studio Tape 04 R642PRE

−
−
Abe Lincoln      Jan Bart – Studio Tape 05 R643PRE

−
−
Artza Alinu       Jan Bart – Studio Tape 05 R643PRE

−
−
Bin Ich Mir A Shnaider'l    Jan Bart – Studio Tape 05 R643PRE

−
−
Frieling     Jan Bart – Studio Tape 05 R643PRE

−
−
Gib Mir up Main Heartz    Jan Bart – Studio Tape 05 R643PRE

−
−
If you are but a dream        Jan Bart – Studio Tape 05 R643PRE

−
−
If You are but a dream English  Jan Bart – Studio Tape 05 R643PRE

−
−
Main Yiddish Mame  Jan Bart – Studio Tape 05 R643PRE

−
−
Natasha    Jan Bart – Studio Tape 05 R643PRE

−
−
Yours Is My Heart Alone  Jan Bart – Studio Tape 05 R643PRE

−
−
80 Er un 70 Zie         Jan Bart – Studio Tape 06 R644PRE

−
−
A Nig'n     Jan Bart – Studio Tape 06 R644PRE

−
−
Allain In Vaig   Jan Bart – Studio Tape 06 R644PRE

−
−
Freg Main Hartz        Jan Bart – Studio Tape 06 R644PRE

−
−
If I Loved You  Jan Bart – Studio Tape 06 R644PRE

−
−
Kum Tzu Mir in Cheider'l  Jan Bart – Studio Tape 06 R644PRE

−
−
Meierke Main zuhn   Jan Bart – Studio Tape 06 R644PRE

−
−
O Sole Mio       Jan Bart – Studio Tape 06 R644PRE

−
−
Stranger in Paradise   Jan Bart – Studio Tape 06 R644PRE

−
−
Tief in Veldeleh        Jan Bart – Studio Tape 06 R644PRE

−
−
V'Hi Sheomdoh         Jan Bart – Studio Tape 06 R644PRE

−
−
Z'Miros     Jan Bart – Studio Tape 06 R644PRE

−
−
A Din Toire Mit Gott         Jan Bart – Studio Tape 07 R637PRE

−
−
Bless This House English  Jan Bart – Studio Tape 07 R637PRE

−
−
Dayenu     Jan Bart – Studio Tape 07 R637PRE

−
−
I Love you much too much         Jan Bart – Studio Tape 07 R637PRE

−
−
Lord Lord Lord          Jan Bart – Studio Tape 07 R637PRE

−
−
Palmach March          Jan Bart – Studio Tape 07 R637PRE

−
−
Six Days in June       Jan Bart – Studio Tape 07 R637PRE

−
−
Yidl Mitn Fidl  Jan Bart – Studio Tape 07 R637PRE

−
−
Your Land and My Land    Jan Bart – Studio Tape 07 R637PRE

−
−
Zei Gezunt        Jan Bart – Studio Tape 07 R637PRE

−
−
Am Yisrael Chai        Jan Bart – Studio Tape 08 R369PRE

−
−
Boy of Mine      Jan Bart – Studio Tape 08 R369PRE

−
−
David Slew the Giant         Jan Bart – Studio Tape 08 R369PRE

−
−
Dudele      Jan Bart – Studio Tape 08 R369PRE

−
−
Mirele       Jan Bart – Studio Tape 08 R369PRE

−
−
That's the Synagogue to Me       Jan Bart – Studio Tape 08 R369PRE

−
−
Track 03 08 LR         Jan Bart – Studio Tape 08 R369PRE

−
−
Veulai       Jan Bart – Studio Tape 08 R369PRE

−
−
Yerushlayim Shel Zahav    Jan Bart – Studio Tape 08 R369PRE

−
−
A Pastuchel A Troimer      Jan Bart – Studio Tape 09 R647PRE

−
−
Always     Jan Bart – Studio Tape 09 R647PRE

−
−
Der Shmeterling un di Blum      Jan Bart – Studio Tape 09 R647PRE

−
−
Don't Take Your Love From Me         Jan Bart – Studio Tape 09 R647PRE

−
−
Mother's Sabbath Candles  Jan Bart – Studio Tape 09 R647PRE

−
−
Nor A Mame     Jan Bart – Studio Tape 09 R647PRE

−
−
Roszhinkes mit Mandlen   Jan Bart – Studio Tape 09 R647PRE

−
−
Zamd un Shteren (cut)       Jan Bart – Studio Tape 09 R647PRE

−
−
A Meisale         Jan Bart – Studio Tape 10 R651PRE

−
−
A Pastuchel (mixup)  Jan Bart – Studio Tape 10 R651PRE

−
−
Mazel       Jan Bart – Studio Tape 10 R651PRE

−
−
Meidele    Jan Bart – Studio Tape 10 R651PRE

−
−
Misirlou (1)      Jan Bart – Studio Tape 10 R651PRE

−
−
Misirlou (2)      Jan Bart – Studio Tape 10 R651PRE

−
−
Rebbe Elimelech       Jan Bart – Studio Tape 10 R651PRE

−
−
Tanchum (cut)  Jan Bart – Studio Tape 10 R651PRE

−
−
Tief Vie Di Nacht      Jan Bart – Studio Tape 10 R651PRE

−
−
Una Furtiva Lagrima          Jan Bart – Studio Tape 10 R651PRE

−
−
Vie A Blum      Jan Bart – Studio Tape 10 R651PRE

−
−
Childhood Hours       Jan Bart – Studio Tape 11 R650PRE

−
−
Come to the Fair        Jan Bart – Studio Tape 11 R650PRE

−
−
Der Yid Der Shmied  Jan Bart – Studio Tape 11 R650PRE

−
−
Dona Dona        Jan Bart – Studio Tape 11 R650PRE

−
−
Eishes Chayil    Jan Bart – Studio Tape 11 R650PRE

−
−
King's Quartet   Jan Bart – Studio Tape 11 R650PRE

−
−
Lovers No More        Jan Bart – Studio Tape 11 R650PRE

−
−
Mattinata  Jan Bart – Studio Tape 11 R650PRE

−
−
Millers Tears     Jan Bart – Studio Tape 11 R650PRE

−
−
Sentimental Heart      Jan Bart – Studio Tape 11 R650PRE

−
−
V'Ulai       Jan Bart – Studio Tape 11 R650PRE

−
−
Chanuka Candles       Jan Bart – Studio Tape 12 R654PRE

−
−
Dancing in the Moonlight  Jan Bart – Studio Tape 12 R654PRE

−
−
David Melech Israel  Jan Bart – Studio Tape 12 R654PRE

−
−
Der Shmeterling un di blum       Jan Bart – Studio Tape 12 R654PRE

−
−
Hine Ma Tov    Jan Bart – Studio Tape 12 R654PRE

−
−
If I ever fall in love again  Jan Bart – Studio Tape 12 R654PRE

−
−
Moon River       Jan Bart – Studio Tape 12 R654PRE

−
−
Those were the days  Jan Bart – Studio Tape 12 R654PRE

−
−
Tum Balalaika  Jan Bart – Studio Tape 12 R654PRE

−
−
We Come to Live      Jan Bart – Studio Tape 12 R654PRE

−
−
Far From the Home I Love         Jan Bart – Studio Tape 13 R653PRE

−
−
I Remember Mama    Jan Bart – Studio Tape 13 R653PRE

−
−
Mai-Ko-Mashma-Lon        Jan Bart – Studio Tape 13 R653PRE

−
−
Now I Have Everything     Jan Bart – Studio Tape 13 R653PRE

−
−
Oif'n Pripechik  Jan Bart – Studio Tape 13 R653PRE

−
−
Reb Dovidel      Jan Bart – Studio Tape 13 R653PRE

−
−
Roszinkes mit Mandlen     Jan Bart – Studio Tape 13 R653PRE

−
−
Abi Gezunt       Jan Bart – Studio Tape 14 R648PRE

−
−
Du In Ich  Jan Bart – Studio Tape 14 R648PRE

−
−
Exodus     Jan Bart – Studio Tape 14 R648PRE

−
−
Four Tailors      Jan Bart – Studio Tape 14 R648PRE

−
−
Hamavdil  Jan Bart – Studio Tape 14 R648PRE

−
−
Ich Vil Eibig Dich Gedenken     Jan Bart – Studio Tape 14 R648PRE

−
−
Maikomashmalon      Jan Bart – Studio Tape 14 R648PRE

−
−
Rachem    Jan Bart – Studio Tape 14 R648PRE

−
−
The Well  Jan Bart – Studio Tape 14 R648PRE

−
−
Vie Der Kaiser Lebt  Jan Bart – Studio Tape 14 R648PRE

−
−
01 Eazy On       Jan Bart – Studio Tape 15 R652PRE

−
−
02 SaniFlush     Jan Bart – Studio Tape 15 R652PRE

−
−
03 Aerowax      Jan Bart – Studio Tape 15 R652PRE

−
−
04 Aerowax      Jan Bart – Studio Tape 15 R652PRE

−
−
05 Aerowax      Jan Bart – Studio Tape 15 R652PRE

−
−
Belz  Jan Bart – Studio Tape 16 R649PRE

−
−
Donna Donna    Jan Bart – Studio Tape 16 R649PRE

−
−
Erev Shel Shoshanim         Jan Bart – Studio Tape 16 R649PRE

−
−
Freig Bei Gott   Jan Bart – Studio Tape 16 R649PRE

−
−
Gib Mier Up Mein Hartz    Jan Bart – Studio Tape 16 R649PRE

−
−
Glick        Jan Bart – Studio Tape 16 R649PRE

−
−
None but the lonely heart  Jan Bart – Studio Tape 16 R649PRE

−
−
Sorento     Jan Bart – Studio Tape 16 R649PRE

−
−
Tief Vie Die Nacht    Jan Bart – Studio Tape 16 R649PRE

−
−
All My Love     Jan Bart – Studio Tape 17 R646PRE

−
−
Eili Eili    Jan Bart – Studio Tape 17 R646PRE

−
−
Farges Mich Nit        Jan Bart – Studio Tape 17 R646PRE

−
−
L'Yader Reb'n   Jan Bart – Studio Tape 17 R646PRE

−
−
Rebe Elimelech         Jan Bart – Studio Tape 17 R646PRE

−
−
Reisele      Jan Bart – Studio Tape 17 R646PRE

−
−
Say Dear that You Love me       Jan Bart – Studio Tape 17 R646PRE

−
−
Shalom     Jan Bart – Studio Tape 17 R646PRE

−
−
Wishing Star     Jan Bart – Studio Tape 17 R646PRE

−
−
Yerushala im     Jan Bart – Studio Tape 17 R646PRE

−
−
Yid'l Mit'n Fid'l         Jan Bart – Studio Tape 17 R646PRE

−
−
A Zemerl  Jan Bart – Studio Tape 18 R645PRE

−
−
Because    Jan Bart – Studio Tape 18 R645PRE

−
−
E Luce Van Le Stelle         Jan Bart – Studio Tape 18 R645PRE

−
−
Have A Romance      Jan Bart – Studio Tape 18 R645PRE

−
−
Havivale   Jan Bart – Studio Tape 18 R645PRE

−
−
Ich Vel Varten Oif Dir       Jan Bart – Studio Tape 18 R645PRE

−
−
Just One Minute's Time     Jan Bart – Studio Tape 18 R645PRE

−
−
Mein Yiddishe Mame        Jan Bart – Studio Tape 18 R645PRE

−
−
Shein Vie Die Levone        Jan Bart – Studio Tape 18 R645PRE

−
−
Yerushala im     Jan Bart – Studio Tape 18 R645PRE

−
−
1-1 Traditsie     Jan Bart – Tikva T-97 Test pressing 1965-03-17

−
−
1-2 Shadchen    Jan Bart – Tikva T-97 Test pressing 1965-03-17

−
−
1-3 Volt ich zain a gvir      Jan Bart – Tikva T-97 Test pressing 1965-03-17

−
−
1-4 Ich muz gain       Jan Bart – Tikva T-97 Test pressing 1965-03-17

−
−
1-5 Heilige Shabbes  Jan Bart – Tikva T-97 Test pressing 1965-03-17

−
−
2-1 Zun shain zun falt        Jan Bart – Tikva T-97 Test pressing 1965-03-17

−
−
2-2 Anatevka    Jan Bart – Tikva T-97 Test pressing 1965-03-17

−
−
2-3 Hobt ich dich lib          Jan Bart – Tikva T-97 Test pressing 1965-03-17

−
−
2-4 Take Ales Hob Ich       Jan Bart – Tikva T-97 Test pressing 1965-03-17

−
−
2-5 LeChaim     Jan Bart – Tikva T-97 Test pressing 1965-03-17

−
−
Jan Bart Live 1  Jan Bart – Unpublished recordings 1936 1954

−
−
Jan Bart Live 2  Jan Bart – Unpublished recordings 1936 1954

−
−
Sol Strauser aka Jan Bart 1936   Jan Bart – Unpublished recordings 1936 1954

−
−
11-2-2 Sparkling Eyes       Yiddish Melodies in Swing – Empire Transcription 11 12

−
−
5973-2b Jan Bart song       Yiddish Melodies in Swing – Empire Transcription 5973-5974

References 

1919 births
1971 deaths
Jewish American musicians
American tenors
20th-century American singers
20th-century American male singers
20th-century American Jews
Polish emigrants to the United States